The hand flute, or handflute, is a musical instrument made out of the player's hands. It is also called a 'Hand ocarina' or 'Hand whistle'. To produce sound, the player creates a chamber of air with their hands, into which they blow air via an opening at the thumbs. There are two common techniques involving the shape of the hand chamber: the "cupped hand" technique and the "interlock" technique.

The pitch depends on how the hands are held. If the space between the hands is made smaller or the opening made larger, the pitch becomes higher: the principles are the same with an ocarina or Helmholtz resonator; see vessel flute for details of the acoustics. The best hand flute players in the world have a range of up to 2.5 octaves.

See also
 Flute
 Ocarina
 Wolf-whistling
 Whistle register
 Whistled language
 Whistling

References

External links
 Handflute Marathon by several hand flute players on YouTube
 Performance by the group "Childhood" on YouTube
 Performances by Peter Hassell on YouTube

Aerophones